Kenneth S. Baer (born 17 October 1972) is an American political advisor and author who served as Associate Director for Communications and Strategic Planning and Senior Advisor for White House's Office of Management and Budget from 2009 to 2012. He is the founder and co-editor of Democracy: A Journal of Ideas. Baer is a former White House speechwriter, author, and analyst. And he is the CEO and Founder of the strategic communications firm, Crosscut Strategies.

Early life and education
Baer graduated from the University of Pennsylvania, where he was elected to Phi Beta Kappa and was editorial page editor of The Daily Pennsylvanian. Afterward, Baer obtained a doctorate in Politics from the University of Oxford as a Thouron Scholar.

Career
Baer was Deputy Director of Speechwriting for Al Gore 2000 presidential campaign and Senior Speechwriter for Vice President Al Gore. He also wrote on technology and telecommunications issues for Federal Communications Commission (FCC) Chairman William Kennard.

During the 2004 presidential election, he was a senior advisor to the Joe Lieberman 2004 presidential campaign and later advised the John Kerry 2004 presidential campaign on a variety of policy issues. During the election, Baer was an online columnist for The American Prospect. He was also a contributor to the blog TPMCafe.

Following the election of President Barack Obama in 2008, he was named Associate Director for Communications and Strategic Planning for Peter R. Orszag, then director of the Office of Management and Budget. Baer remained in the position when Orszag resigned, and left OMB in July 2012.

In addition to running his own consultancy firm, Crosscut Strategies, he has taught at Georgetown University and at Johns Hopkins University.

Baer is the author of Reinventing Democrats: The Politics of Liberalism from Reagan to Clinton. He has also published commentaries in Slate, the Los Angeles Times, and the Washington Post. He has appeared as a political analyst on CNN, MSNBC, Fox News, ABC News, NPR, BBC, and CBC.

References

1972 births
Living people
Alumni of the University of Oxford
University of Pennsylvania alumni
Georgetown University faculty
Johns Hopkins University faculty
American political journalists
American speechwriters
Alumni of Nuffield College, Oxford
The Daily Pennsylvanian people
Obama administration personnel